The Peugeot Type 176 is a top of the range car produced from 1925 until 1928 by the French auto manufacturer Peugeot. The car had a four-cylinder 2493 cc engine, which was a more modern design than earlier, and despite the low cylinder capacity, the car performed better than its predecessors. The car is featured in the film Midnight in Paris.

References

Type 176
Rear-wheel-drive vehicles
Cars introduced in 1925